Svante E. Cornell (born 1975) is a Swedish scholar specializing on politics and security issues in Eurasia, especially the South Caucasus, Turkey, and Central Asia. He is a director and co-founder of the Stockholm-based Institute for Security and Development Policy (ISDP), and Research Director of the Central Asia-Caucasus Institute & Silk Road Studies Program (CACI), and joined the American Foreign Policy Council as a Senior Fellow for Eurasia in January 2017.

Education
Cornell studied at the Department of the International Relations, Middle East Technical University, Ankara, Turkey. He earned a Ph.D. in Peace and Conflict Studies from Uppsala University in Uppsala, Sweden.

Career
Cornell is a co-founder and director of the Institute for Security and Development Policy. He is the director of the Central Asia-Caucasus Institute & Silk Road Studies Program, a joint center run by ISDP in collaboration with the American Foreign Policy Council (AFPC). Cornell is also a Senior Fellow for Eurasia at AFPC. He is also the editor in Chief of the Joint Center's biweekly publications, Central Asia-Caucasus Analyst and Turkey Analyst. 

In 2000 Cornell took part in the Baku-Ceyhan oil odyssey, a project dedicated at bringing the first barrel of Azerbaijan oil to the Turkey port of Ceyhan with Ural sidecar bikes.

From 2002 to 2003 served as the course Chair of the Caucasus Area Studies at the Foreign Service Institute of the U.S. Department of State.

Writings
Cornell's doctoral thesis was entitled Autonomy and Conflict: Ethnoterritoriality and Separatism in the South Caucasus – Cases in Georgia.

He is the author of a number of books, including Small Nations and Great Powers: A Study of Ethnopolitical Conflict in the Caucasus.

In 2009, together with S. Frederick Starr, he edited The Guns of August 2008: Russia's War in Georgia, which addresses the causes and consequences of the 2008 South Ossetia War.

Cornell's op-eds and commentary have appeared in the Jerusalem Post, Le Monde, The New York Times, The Guardian, the International Herald Tribune, Le Figaro, The Baltimore Sun, Dagens Nyheter, the Moscow Times, Turkish Daily News, the Los Angeles Times, and The Washington Times. He also published a paper for NRB Analysis.

Criticism
Swedish Member of Parliament Fredrik Malm criticized Cornell for his connections with Azerbaijani president Ilham Aliyev: "There may be reasons to have contacts with dictatorships, but there is a difference between having contacts and systematically confirming a dictatorship, and even praising the dictator. Svante Cornell’s demarcation is diffuse to say the least. In my eyes, he appears to be an accomplice, much like those ones we saw during the Cold War who defended the Soviet Union."

According to the Swedish newspaper Dagens Nyheter, Cornell has close ties to the Azerbaijani government and has been criticized for portraying the country's government in a favorable light.

Honors and awards

Cornell has received an honorary doctorate from the National Academy of Sciences of Azerbaijan.

Books
 Cornell, Svante E. Small Nations and Great Powers: A Study of Ethnopolitical Conflict, 2001. 
 Cornell, Svante E. The Wider Black Sea Region: An Emerging Hub in European Security, Central Asia-Caucasus Institute & Silk Road Studies Program, 2006. 
 Cornell, Svante E. Georgia after the Rose Revolution: Geopolitical Predicament and Implications for U.S. Policy, Army War College monograph, 2007.
 Cornell, Svante E.; Starr, S. Frederick., eds. The Guns of August 2008: Russia's War in Georgia, 2009. 
 Cornell, Svante E. Azerbaijan Since Independence, 2010.

References

External links

Resume at SAIS Johns Hopkins University (archived)

1975 births
Living people
Swedish political scientists
Academic staff of Uppsala University
Middle East Technical University alumni